Double Dad is a 2021 Brazilian comedy-drama film directed by Cris D'Amato, written by Renato Fagundes and Thalita Rebouças and starring Maisa Silva, Eduardo Moscovis and Marcelo Médici.

Cast 
 Maisa Silva as Vicenza
 Eduardo Moscovis as Paco
 Marcelo Médici as Giovanne
 Laila Zaid as Raion
 Caio Vegatti as Nando
 Pedro Ottoni as Cadu
 Rayana Diniz as Betina
 Fafá de Belém as Mother Moon
 Thaynara OG as Lucinha
 Roberto Bonfim as Arthur
 Flávia Garrafa as Jade
 Raquel Fabbri as Marta
 João Pydd as Rael
 Felipe Rodrigues as Guilherme
 Thalita Rebouças as Receptionist

Release
The film was digitally released on January 15, 2021 by Netflix.

References

External links 
 
 

2021 films
2021 comedy-drama films
Brazilian comedy-drama films
2020s Portuguese-language films
Portuguese-language Netflix original films